The Trade Descriptions Act 1968 is an Act of the Parliament of the United Kingdom which prevents manufacturers, retailers or service industry providers from misleading consumers as to what they are spending their money on.
This law empowers the judiciary to punish companies or individuals who make false claims about the products or services that they sell.

Applying a false trade description to goods is a strict liability offence: provided it is shown that the description was applied and was false, the accused has to prove certain defences in order to escape conviction.

False descriptions as to services require the more normal proof of mens rea (guilty intent).

The Act excludes matters relating to land and buildings, which are now dealt with under the provisions of the Property Misdescriptions Act 1991.

Changes

The Act was in conflict with the EU Unfair Commercial Practices Directive, which has been adopted in the UK and was implemented from April 2008.

Although technically the Act itself remains in force, most of its specific provisions were repealed and superseded by the Consumer Protection from Unfair Trading Regulations 2008 which came into force 26 May 2008, missing the EU deadline for implementation by 12 June 2007.  The repeals and revocations for TDA 1968 are:
Trade Descriptions Act 1968 c.29 Sections 1(1), 5 to 10, 13 to 15, 19(4)(b) and (c), 21(1) and (2), 22, 24(3), 32, 37, and 39(2).

See also
 Crunchy Frog

External links 
 The Trade Descriptions Act 1968
 Guidance Note on the Trade Descriptions Act

United Kingdom Acts of Parliament 1968
Consumer protection in the United Kingdom